Woburn Sands railway station serves the town of Woburn Sands and the village of Wavendon in the City of Milton Keynes in Buckinghamshire, England. The station is served by local trains to Bletchley and Bedford using Class 230 multiple units. This station is one of the seven stations serving the Milton Keynes urban area.

Station building and signal box

Woburn Sands has a black and white "cottage" station building, one of four of the same design that are unique to this line. The building is in a half-timbered Gothic Revival style that had been insisted upon by the 7th Duke of Bedford for stations close to the Woburn Estate. It is Grade II listed. It opened with the line in 1846; between 1871 and July 1967 had a sizeable goods yard serving various local businesses (including a brick factory and gas works).

In August 2004, Woburn Sands lost its Victorian signal box to the development and modernisation of the route. Until 2004 the line was controlled by staffed signal boxes located at various stations; but the entire line is now controlled from one signalling centre at Ridgmont.

Services
At present an hourly service operates each way, operated by a Class 230 DEMU. There is no service on a Sunday.

Community Rail Partnership
Woburn Sands station, in common with others on the Marston Vale line, is covered by the Marston Vale Community Rail Partnership, which aims to increase use of the line by involving local people.

Location

The nearest post-code is MK17 8UD.

Footnotes

References

External links

Postcard pictures of the station and level crossing in 1920 (at end of page)

Railway stations in Milton Keynes
Railway stations in Buckinghamshire
DfT Category F2 stations
Former London and North Western Railway stations
Railway stations in Great Britain opened in 1846
Railway stations served by West Midlands Trains
East West Rail